Grand Isle State Park may refer to a place in the United States:

Grand Isle State Park (Louisiana)
Grand Isle State Park (Vermont)